James L. Snyder (March 10, 1909 – June 29, 1939) was an American race car driver. He also played one game for the Milwaukee Badgers of the National Football League (NFL) in 1925. At the age of 16 in his NFL debut, he was one of the youngest players in NFL history.

Snyder was part of the midget car "Chicago Gang" with Emil Andres, Tony Bettenhausen, Cowboy O'Rourke, Paul Russo, and Wally Zale. They toured tracks in the Midwest and East Coast of the United States.

Snyder won the 1937 track championship at the Chicago Armory & Riverview. He also set a new track record at the Indianapolis Motor Speedway for that season's Indianapolis 500.

Snyder appeared in five Indianapolis 500 events. He won the pole for the 1939 Indianapolis 500, setting another new track record in the process. He finished second in the event.

Death
Snyder died of a race-related accident on June 29, 1939 in Cahokia, Illinois, at the age of 30, while racing in an appearance to help a midget car promoter.

Indianapolis 500 results

References

External links
 

1909 births
1939 deaths
Milwaukee Badgers players
AAA Championship Car drivers
Indianapolis 500 drivers
Indianapolis 500 polesitters
People from Chicago
Racing drivers who died while racing
Racing drivers from Chicago
Racing drivers from Illinois
Sports deaths in Illinois